JNN can refer to:

 Japan News Network AKA JNN
 Nanortalik Heliport (IATA airport code), in Nanortalik, Greenland
 Joint Network Node